The Burnaby Range is a small subrange of the Kitimat Ranges, located on Pit Island, British Columbia, Canada. It contains only one named mountain called Sylvan Peak.

References

Burnaby Range in the Canadian Mountain Encyclopedia

Kitimat Ranges